John Louis Nayar (J L Nayar) (Telugu: జాన్ లుయీస్ నాయర్) (1924–2011) was a Physician, singer, freedom fighter and social reformer who served as chairman for CBM High School, Main road, Visakhapatnam.

Early life and education
J L Nayar was born to K.K. Raman Nair of Palghat, Kerala and Prantoshini Nayar of Berhampur on 18 April 1924, Nayar had his early education at Berhampur. Latter J.L Nayar had graduated from the Andhra Medical College, Visakhapatnam, in 1949. when he was barely 13, his friend Uma Charan Patnaik introduced him to Subhas Chandra Bose in Cuttack in 1939. With his inspiration J. L Nayar inducted himself into the Seva Samithi Scout movement, formed by Netaji in Berhampur despite of his tender age. J.L.Nayar used to sing the Telugu songs to ignite the young minds in Subash Chandra Bose public meetings at the Berhampur Barracks at the Old Bus Stand organised by Seva Samithi Scout movement.

Being a great fan of the immortal singer, Kundan Lal Saigal, Dr. Nayar, himself is a gifted singer. Being fluent in Hindi, Bengali or Urdu, Dr. Nayar used to sing every song of Saigal, and gave several stage performances, a majority of which were held in Vizag and a few were organised in cities like Delhi, Chennai, Kolkata, Bangalore, Berhampur and Bhubaneswar. Dr. Nayar is also an innovative dancer and choreographer. He is a Kathakali exponent and choreographed some dance features like Dance of the seasons, Temple dances and a dance ballet Prakrithi-Purushudu with the help of his wife, Shakuntala Nayar, who is also a dancer. Dr. Nayar gave his probably last special performance in aid of Kargil war heroes at Kalabharati auditorium and sent the audience into raptures. The donations collected were Rs.1.20 lakh and the amount was sent to the Central Army Welfare Fund through the District Collector.

Professional career
Dr. Nayar apart from being a medical consultant to many public sector industries in and around Visakhapatnam, he had a non profit making private practice in slum areas of Visakhapatnam creating awareness about Sexually Transmitted Diseases and public hygiene. After assuming the charge as Chairman of Canadian Baptist Mission High School from Padma Sri Hilda Mary Lazarus he dedicated most of his time for strengthening primary education in Uttarandhra. He believes in secret donations and practiced it throughout his life.

Honors
In 1999, he was honored with the title "Abhinava Saigal" award by Andhra Medical College.

Death
Dr. Nayar died on 3 May 2011 after a prolonged illness in his residence at Visakhapatnam.

References

20th-century Indian medical doctors
1924 births
2011 deaths
People from Ganjam district
Medical doctors from Odisha